The arrondissement of Fort-de-France is an arrondissement in the French overseas region and department of Martinique. It has four communes.

Composition

The communes of the arrondissement of Fort-de-France, and their INSEE codes, are:
 Fort-de-France (97209)
 Le Lamentin (97213)
 Saint-Joseph (97224)
 Schœlcher (97229)

History

At the creation of the department of Martinique in 1947, its only arrondissement was Fort-de-France. It lost 10 communes to the new arrondissement of La Trinité in 1965, 12 communes to the new arrondissement of Le Marin in 1974, and eight communes to the new arrondissement of Saint-Pierre in 1995.

Before 2015, the arrondissements of Martinique were subdivided into cantons. The cantons of the arrondissement of Fort-de-France were, as of January 2015:

 Fort-de-France 1st Canton
 Fort-de-France 2nd Canton
 Fort-de-France 3rd Canton
 Fort-de-France 4th Canton
 Fort-de-France 5th Canton
 Fort-de-France 6th Canton
 Fort-de-France 7th Canton
 Fort-de-France 8th Canton
 Fort-de-France 9th Canton
 Fort-de-France 10th Canton
 Le Lamentin 1st Canton Sud-Bourg
 Le Lamentin 2nd Canton Nord
 Le Lamentin 3rd Canton Est
 Saint-Joseph
 Schœlcher 1st Canton
 Schœlcher 2nd Canton

References

Fort-de-France